Lanitz-Hassel-Tal is a municipality in the Burgenlandkreis district, in Saxony-Anhalt, Germany. It was formed by the merger of the previously independent municipalities Möllern and Taugwitz, on 1 July 2009.

References

Burgenlandkreis